Events in the year 2023 in Serbia.

Incumbents 

 President: Aleksandar Vučić
 Prime Minister: Ana Brnabić
 President of the National Assembly: Vladimir Orlić

Events 
Ongoing — COVID-19 pandemic in Serbia

 8 January – NATO rejects Serbia's request to deploy up to 1,000 of Serbia's troops and military police in North Kosovo.

Deaths 

 4 January – Zoran Kalezić, 72, Serbian-Montenegrin singer.
 5 January – Dušan Veličković, 75–76, writer, journalist and filmmaker.
 7 January – Zinaid Memišević, 72, Bosnian-Serbian actor (2012, Miracle, Bolji život).
 8 January – Borislav Dević, 59, Olympic marathoner (1996).
 9 January – Charles Simic, 84, Serbian-born American poet.
 13 January – Gordana Kuić, 80, novelist (The Scent of Rain in the Balkans).
 27 January – Saša Petrović, 61, Bosnian-Serbian actor (It's Hard to Be Nice, Fuse, Lud, zbunjen, normalan).
 8 February – Branka Veselinović, 104, actress (A Child of the Community).

References 

 
2020s in Serbia
Years of the 21st century in Serbia
Serbia
Serbia